Søderlind is a Norwegian surname. Notable people with the surname include:

 Didrik Søderlind (born 1971), Norwegian secular humanist and skeptic 
 Ragnar Søderlind (born 1945), Norwegian composer

See also
 Söderlund

Norwegian-language surnames